Skold vs. KMFDM is a full-length album featuring Sascha Konietzko of KMFDM and Tim Sköld. The album consists of two versions of 11 different songs — each appearing as the original version and a shorter "interlude" version. The album was released on February 24, 2009 on KMFDM Records exclusively through the band's KMFDM Store. It has since been made available for download elsewhere.

The artwork for the album's cover was created by artist Kevin Marburg, formerly of the bands Diatribe and SKOLD.

Track listing

References

2009 albums
KMFDM albums
Collaborative albums